Norbert Nolty Chabert, known as Norby Chabert (born November 28, 1975), is a former member of the Louisiana State Senate. Initially elected as a Democrat, Chabert became a  Republican in 2011, criticizing the response of Barack Obama to the Deepwater Horizon oil spill.

References

1975 births
21st-century American politicians
Businesspeople from Louisiana
Cajun people
Living people
Louisiana Democrats
Louisiana Republicans
Louisiana state senators
Nicholls State University alumni
People from Houma, Louisiana